Edrecolomab (MAb17-1A, trade name Panorex) is a mouse-derived monoclonal antibody targeting the cell-surface glycoprotein EpCAM (17-1A), which is expressed on epithelial tissues and on various carcinomas.

Preliminary studies had shown promise of a possible use in patients with stage III colorectal carcinoma (with metastasis to the lymph nodes). No effect has been demonstrated for stage II (locally advanced cancer without spread to the lymph nodes) colon cancer.

Edrecolomab was well tolerated in these studies and as such research has now concentrated on whether it can be of any use in other forms of cancer.

References 

Monoclonal antibodies for tumors
Experimental drugs